Blerta is an Albanian female given name, which means "green" or blossom, from the Albanian blertë. The male equivalent is Blerti. The name may refer to:

Blerti Hajdari (born 1990), Albanian football player
Blerta Syla (born 1978), Kosovar actress
Blerta Zhegu, Albanian opera singer

References

Albanian feminine given names